Dennis Denisoff is a Canadian author, poet and scholar, and the Endowed McFarlin Chair of Literature and Film in the English Department at the University of Tulsa. Denisoff was an early member of The Kootenay School of Writing.

Biography

Education 
He completed a PhD at McGill University and a postdoctoral fellowship at Princeton University, and is currently McFarlin Professor of Victorian Literature and Culture at the University of Tulsa. His research specialties include gender/sexuality studies, decadence/aestheticism, eco-studies, and pagan eco-politics.

Career 
He was an early member of The Kootenay School of Writing in the 1980s, writing poetry and prose at the intersection of queer identity and LANGUAGE poetics. A runner-up in the Three-Day Novel Contest in 1989, Denisoff's debut novel Dog Years was published in 1991 by Arsenal Pulp Press while he was a Ph.D. student at McGill University. The novel, about a protagonist with HIV/AIDS, was a finalist for the Hugh Maclennan Prize in 1992 and the Norma Epstein Award.

In 1994, Denisoff published a poetry collection, Tender Agencies, and edited the anthology Queeries: An Anthology of Gay Male Prose. His second novel, The Winter Gardeners, was published in 2003, and in 2004 he published The Broadview Anthology of Victorian Short Stories.

His academic publications include Erín Moure and Her Works (1995), Aestheticism and Sexual Parody: 1840-1940 (2001), and Sexual Visuality from Literature to film: 1850-1950 (2004). He is the editor of The Nineteenth-Century Child and Consumer Culture (2008), a special issue of Victorian Review on Natural Environments (2011), and another for Victorian Literature and Culture on Scales of Decadence, as well as being a co-editor of Perennial Decay: On the Aesthetics and Politics of Decadence (1999) and the digital humanities project The Yellow Nineties Online (2015). He has also been a co-editor of the journals White Wall Review, Nineteenth Century Studies and Feminist Modernist Literature. He is the recipient of the President's Award from the Nineteenth Century Studies Association and the Sarwan Sohata Distinguished Scholar Award from Ryerson University, and has been a visiting researcher at the University of Exeter, Cambridge University, and Queen Mary—University of London.

Personal life 
He lives in Tulsa, Oklahoma, with his partner Morgan Holmes.

Works

Fiction
Dog Years (1991)
The Winter Gardeners (2003)

Poetry
Tender Agencies (1994)

Anthologies
Queeries: An Anthology of Gay Male Prose (1994)
The Broadview Anthology of Victorian Short Stories (2004)
Arthur Machen: Decadent and Occult Works (2019)

Academic
Erín Moure and Her Works (1995)
Perennial Decay: On the Aesthetics and Politics of Decadence (co-edited with Liz Constable and Matt Potolsky, 1999)
Aestheticism and Sexual Parody: 1840-1940 (2001)
Sexual Visuality from Literature to Film: 1850-1950 (2004)
The Nineteenth-Century Child and Consumer Culture (2008)
Natural Environments guest edited special issue of Victorian Review
The Yellow Nineties Online (co-edited with Lorraine Janzen Kooistra, 2015)
The Routledge Companion to Victorian Literature (co-edited with Talia Schaffer, 2020)
Scales of Decadence guest edited special issue of Victorian Literature and Culture (2021)

References

External links
Dennis Denisoff

Canadian male novelists
20th-century Canadian novelists
20th-century Canadian poets
20th-century Canadian male writers
Canadian male poets
21st-century Canadian novelists
Canadian anthologists
Canadian LGBT novelists
Canadian LGBT poets
Canadian gay writers
McGill University alumni
Academic staff of Toronto Metropolitan University
Living people
Year of birth missing (living people)
21st-century Canadian male writers
21st-century Canadian LGBT people
Gay poets
Gay novelists